Fluturim Domi (born 14 October 2000) is an Albanian professional footballer who currently play as a forward for Albanian club FK Kukësi.

References

2000 births
Living people
People from Kukës County
People from Kukës
Albanian footballers
Association football forwards
Kategoria Superiore players
Kategoria e Dytë players
FK Kukësi players
FK Kukësi B players